The Libertarian Party of Connecticut is a statewide affiliate of the U.S. Libertarian Party. According to the bylaws posted on its web site, the Connecticut Libertarian Party has the basic aims of furthering individual freedom and opposing the initiation of force against individuals, among other things. It does this by engaging in political, educational, and social activities.

The party leadership declined to endorse celebrity author Ann Coulter in a run for Congress in 2000, in a bid against Chris Shays for the 4th district. As a result, her congressional campaign did not take place.

Sub-affiliates
 The Libertarian Party of the Naugatuck Valley
 The Libertarian Party of the Housatonic Valley
 The Libertarian Party of Windham County

Registration and Membership
To register as a member of the Libertarian Party with the Connecticut Secretary of the State, an eligible voter must write in "Libertarian" in Box 9 of the state voter registration form. As of November 5, 2018, it was the state's fourth largest party, trailing the Democratic, Republican, and Independent parties.

Voters may also register with the state party itself as either an associate member or a full member. An associate member does not pay dues, may not be a member of the State Central Committee or the Judiciary Committee, and does not have voting privileges at party functions, such as its annual convention. A full member enjoys all membership privileges and must pay annual dues of $25. Both associate members and full members must sign the Libertarian pledge, which states "I hereby certify that I do not believe in or advocate the initiation of force to achieve political, social, or economic goals."

A voter may register with the state Libertarian Party as either a full or associate member while remaining a registered member of another party with the Secretary of the State.

Elected Officials
Gordon Haave was the first Libertarian elected to public office in the state of Connecticut. He was elected in a non-partisan election as a Greenwich Representative Town Meeting member in November, 1995. There have been several people who affiliate with the Libertarian Party elected to local offices on other party ballot lines. Most recently, in November, 2013 Joshua Katz was elected on the Republican line to the Westbrook Planning Commission, and Sean Foley was elected on the Democratic line to the Burlington Board of Finance. There have also been several people affiliated with the Libertarian Party who have served in appointed office. Most recently, Robin Lasky was appointed in June, 2016 to the Branford Solid Waste Management Commission, and Matthew Radant was appointed in November, 2017 to the Plainfield Board of Education.

2018 Candidates
The following candidates were on the ballot:

US Senate: Richard Lion

US House 2: Daniel Reale

Governor: Rod Hanscomb

Lieutenant Governor: Jeffrey Thibeault

Comptroller: Paul Passarelli

Secretary of State: Heather Gwynn

Treasurer: Jesse Brohinsky

General Assembly 9: Anthony Armetta

General Assembly 65: Kent Johnson

General Assembly 83: Roger Misbach

General Assembly 91: Gary Walsh

Election results

An asterisk in the percentage column indicates a multi-winner district, rather than a single winner district.

2019
Aaron Lewis was on the ballot as a petitioning candidate, but changed his voter registration from Democrat to Libertarian shortly before the election.

2018

2017
The candidates for Norwich city council received a cumulative 10.2% of the vote (2,786 votes for Libertarian candidates out of a total of 27,352 votes cast for the office.)

2016

2015

2014

2013
The candidates for Norwich city council received a cumulative 14.0 of the vote (2,868 votes for Libertarian candidates out of a total of 20,442 votes cast for the office.)

2012

After receiving the largest vote total in Connecticut Libertarian Party history, Paul Passarelli became the party's first US Senate candidate to retain ballot access for that office despite the towns of Middlefield and Washington failing to report any votes for his candidacy to the Secretary of the State. The town of Seymour also inadvertently failed to report any votes for both Libertarian Party Presidential candidate Gary Johnson and Independent Party candidate Rocky Anderson on its amended returns to the Secretary of the State after including the correct totals of 72 votes for Johnson and 37 votes for Anderson on its initial returns. The towns of East Windsor and Preston also inadvertently failed to report any votes for a combined 14 Working Families and Independent Party candidates.  The unfortunate cluster of errors was not noticed until after the Statement of Vote was officially certified and changes cannot be made to the Statement of Vote after that time.

2010

In 2010 John Szewczyk became the first and only Libertarian Party candidate to appear on the ballot as a cross endorsed candidate for a state or federal office. He was cross endorsed by the Republican, Independent, and Connecticut for Lieberman Parties.

2008

2006

2005

2004

2003

2002

2001

2000

Michael Costanza's 26.1% of the vote in General Assembly District 43 set the Connecticut Libertarian Party record for the highest vote percentage for a state or federal candidate. His 40.2% of the vote in the North Stonington portion of the two town district bested both his Republican and Democratic opponents.

1999

1998

1996

Finances
The finances of the Libertarian Party of Connecticut State Central Committee are public record. Its primary expenditures involve ballot access for candidates. Its second largest expense is its annual convention. Speakers at past conventions include consumer privacy advocate Katherine Albrecht, taxpayer advocate Carla Howell, former Libertarian Party Presidential candidate Michael Badnarik, investment broker Peter Schiff, and Scott Wilson, President of the gun rights advocacy group Connecticut Citizens Defense League. Other large expenses include fundraising expenses and the purchase of literature and products for election advertising, such as yard signs, handouts, and DVDs. It does not have a regularly paid staff.

Walter Gengarelly Jr. Award
The Connecticut Libertarian Party State Central Committee issues the Walter Gengarelly Jr. Award at its annual convention to a person who has exhibited a "sustained and selfless effort to support the cause of liberty" at "extreme sacrifice to him or herself."  Walter Gengarelly spent nearly three decades in service to the Connecticut Libertarian Party. In 1982 he was the party's first Gubernatorial candidate and he died in 2010 in the midst of a campaign for the 5th Congressional District.

See also
 List of state parties of the Libertarian Party (United States)

References

External links
 Libertarian Party of Connecticut web site

Connecticut
Political parties in Connecticut